Iván Rodrigo Herrera Muñoz (born 10 October 1985) is a Chilean former professional footballer who played as a midfielder.

Club career
A product of Huachipato, Herrera came to the club from Deportivo Lamiplanch, after playing in a youth championship. Along with Huachipato U17, he won the Juegos de la Araucanía Championship in 2003. He made his professional debut in 2005 versus Deportes La Serena. Since 2007, he played for many clubs in the Chilean footballsuch as Iberia, Naval, Deportes Melipilla, among other clubs. In addition, in 2009 he had a step with the Tecos B-team in the Liga Premier de México.

He is well-remembered by the Naval de Talcahuano fans after his two steps with the team.

In 2019 he joined Chapulineros de Oaxaca in the Serie B de México, also playing for the Football 7 team. In the context of COVID-19 pandemic, in 2020 he returned to Chile while he was a player of Chapulineros de Oaxaca.

Personal life
He was nicknamed Pichunga since he was a child, due to the fact that he used to say Pichunga instead of Pichanga, an informal form to refer to a football game in Chile.

Since his step with Tecos B, he has a close friendship with the Mexican international goalkeeper José de Jesús Corona.

References

External links
 
 
 Iván Herrera at PlaymakerStats

1985 births
Living people
People from Talcahuano
Chilean footballers
Association football forwards
C.D. Huachipato footballers
Rangers de Talca footballers
Tecos F.C. footballers
Naval de Talcahuano footballers
Puerto Montt footballers
Coquimbo Unido footballers
Deportes Valdivia footballers
Deportes Iberia footballers
Deportes Magallanes footballers
Magallanes footballers
Deportes Santa Cruz footballers
Deportes Melipilla footballers
Chapulineros de Oaxaca footballers
Chilean Primera División players
Primera B de Chile players
Liga Premier de México players
Segunda División Profesional de Chile players
Liga de Balompié Mexicano players
Chilean expatriate sportspeople in Mexico
Expatriate footballers in Mexico